The 1976–77 Scottish First Division season was won by St Mirren, who were promoted along with Clydebank to  the Premier Division. Raith Rovers and Falkirk were relegated to the Second Division.

Table

References

Scottish First Division seasons
2
Scot